The 2008–09 season was the 112th season in Sunderland A.F.C.'s history and 104th in the league system of English football.

Background

In preparation for their Premier League campaign, Sunderland spent around £40,000,000 in the 2007–08 season. Signings included the club's record signing of Craig Gordon for £9,000,000, Michael Chopra for £5,000,000, and Kieran Richardson for an undisclosed fee believed to be in the region of £5,500,000. Roy Keane began his managerial tenure in the Premier League with a win over Tottenham Hotspur through a last minute goal from Michael Chopra. In an attempt to bolster their goalscoring chances, Sunderland signed Kenwyne Jones from Southampton for £6,000,000. The club came close to their first Tyne-Wear derby victory at home in 17 years when they drew with Newcastle United. They had taken the lead before half time, but Shola Ameobi equalised an hour into the game. Michael Chopra missed the opportunity to win the game by heading the ball onto the crossbar.

A tribute was paid to 1973 FA Cup Final goalscorer Ian Porterfield in a game against Reading. Sunderland marked the occasion by winning 2–1. A win over Aston Villa sparked a three-game winning streak, when Sunderland overcame West Ham United and Fulham to extend their lead over the relegation area. They sealed their Premier League safety in a 3–2 win over local rivals Middlesbrough through a 90th-minute goal from Daryl Murphy. They finished the season in fifteenth place, on 39 points.

Match results

Legend

Pre-season

Premier League

League table

Results summary

Results per matchday

FA Cup

League Cup

Players

First-team squad
Squad at end of season.

Left club during season

Statistics

Appearances and goals

|-
! colspan=14 style=background:#dcdcdc; text-align:center| Goalkeepers

|-
! colspan=14 style=background:#dcdcdc; text-align:center| Defenders

|-
! colspan=14 style=background:#dcdcdc; text-align:center| Midfielders

|-
! colspan=14 style=background:#dcdcdc; text-align:center| Forwards

|-
! colspan=14 style=background:#dcdcdc; text-align:center| Players transferred out during the season

|-

Goal scorers

Transfers

In

Out

Loans in

Loans out

See also 
2008–09 in English football

Notes

References

Sunderland A.F.C. seasons
Sunderland